

484001–484100 

|-bgcolor=#f2f2f2
| colspan=4 align=center | 
|}

484101–484200 

|-bgcolor=#f2f2f2
| colspan=4 align=center | 
|}

484201–484300 

|-bgcolor=#f2f2f2
| colspan=4 align=center | 
|}

484301–484400 

|-bgcolor=#f2f2f2
| colspan=4 align=center | 
|}

484401–484500 

|-bgcolor=#f2f2f2
| colspan=4 align=center | 
|}

484501–484600 

|-bgcolor=#f2f2f2
| colspan=4 align=center | 
|}

484601–484700 

|-id=613
| 484613 Cerebrito ||  || Blanca Lacruz "Cerebrito" Pleguezuelos (born 1998) began studying Biochemistry at the Universidad Autónoma de Madrid in 2016. She shares with her family and the discoverer the passion for astronomical observation from La Cañada. || 
|}

484701–484800 

|-id=734
| 484734 Chienshu ||  || Shu Chien (born 1931), a Chinese–American physiologist and bioengineer, who received the U.S. Medal of Science in 2010. In the early 1980s, he was a pioneer in cellular and molecular bioengineering. || 
|}

484801–484900 

|-bgcolor=#f2f2f2
| colspan=4 align=center | 
|}

484901–485000 

|-bgcolor=#f2f2f2
| colspan=4 align=center | 
|}

References 

484001-485000